The 1976 United States presidential election in Arkansas took place on November 2, 1976, as part of the wider 1976 United States presidential election. State voters chose six electors to represent them in the Electoral College.

Arkansas overwhelmingly voted for the Democratic Party, former governor of Georgia Jimmy Carter and his running mate Minnesota U.S. Senator Walter Mondale with 64.94% of the vote. The Carter/Mondale ticket defeated Republican incumbent president Gerald Ford of Michigan and his running mate Kansas U.S. Senator Bob Dole in the state by a margin of 30.01%. Arkansas weighed in as nearly thirty percent more Democratic than the national average.

Analysis
Politics in Arkansas during this time period were dominated by the Democratic Party. In the last few elections, the party’s influence began to decline due to Southern Democrats having opposed the national party’s support for the Civil Rights Movement in the 1960s, resulting in George Wallace and Richard Nixon carrying the state in 1968 and 1972 respectively. In the aftermath of Watergate and Nixon’s resignation, the nation, including Arkansas’ overall mood towards the Republican Party dropped.

Jimmy Carter, a native Southern and former governor of Georgia, appealed to many Southern Democrats and Arkansas voters who saw him as a Washington outsider. Carter carried Arkansas in a landslide, winning 72 of the state’s 75 counties, the vast majority of which gave him over sixty percent of the vote. Carter’s weakest performance was in the state’s northwestern region, historically the strongest region in the state for Republicans. The following three counties were carried by President Ford: Baxter (Mountain Home), Benton (Bentonville, Rogers), and Sebastian (Fort Smith). This was the first presidential election in which Pulaski County, home to the capital city of Little Rock, recorded over 100,000 total votes.

, this is the last presidential election that the Democratic candidate won over sixty percent of the vote in Arkansas. The state would become friendlier towards the Republican Party after 1980, the only exceptions to this are 1992 and 1996, when Arkansas native Bill Clinton won the state in both of his presidential runs. This is also the last election in which Searcy County and Crawford County voted for the Democratic candidate. This remains the last time that Arkansas would vote for a Democratic candidate in a close election, as the aforementioned Bill Clinton won both of his elections by a considerable margin.

Results

Results by county

See also
 United States presidential elections in Arkansas

References

1976
1976 Arkansas elections
Arkansas